"Gimme All Your Lovin'" is a song by ZZ Top from their 1983 album Eliminator. It was released as the album's first single in 1983.

The single reached No. 37 on the US Billboard Hot 100 chart), and reached No. 10 on the UK Singles Chart. It ties with the band's 1992 cover of Elvis Presley's "Viva Las Vegas" as their highest-charting single in the UK. The song was produced by band manager Bill Ham, and recorded and mixed by Terry Manning.

Music video
The "Gimme All Your Lovin music video follows a young male gas station attendant who is taken for a ride by a trio of women driving the vintage Eliminator car. The band appears and disappears, and they throw the attendant the keys to the car. The three main actresses were Jeana Tomasino from Wisconsin, Danièle Arnaud from Nice, France, and a third model who dropped out of contact and was not paid. Tomasino had posed for Playboy in 1980.

Record executive Jeff Ayeroff saw how MTV was reshaping popular music throughout 1982. After he joined Warner Bros. Records in early 1983, he convinced them to pay for the first ZZ Top music video, for "Gimme All Your Lovin. Warner hired filmmaker Tim Newman to direct it. Newman's siblings David, Thomas and Maria scored orchestral music, and his cousin was songwriter Randy Newman. Tim Newman met with Ham and the band to discuss ideas for the video. He returned to direct the videos for "Sharp Dressed Man" and "Legs".

Gimme All Your Lovin' 2000

A cover by Martay featuring ZZ Top, called "Gimme All Your Lovin' 2000", charted in Top 40 in several European countries in 1999 including number 28 in the UK.

Other versions
Kym Mazelle and Jocelyn Brown's 1994 rendition, which utilized a sample from C+C Music Factory's "Deeper Love", reached number 22 in the UK Singles Chart.
In 1993 a Finnish band Leningrad Cowboys recorded on the Helsinki Senate Square a live cover version of this song featuring Red Army Choir, with a bit of the National Anthem of the Soviet Union making its way into the arrangement, along with choruses of Hallelujah as well.
Lonestar released a version of the song in 2002 for the album Sharp Dressed Men: A Tribute to ZZ Top.
In 2011, American band Filter covered the song for the tribute album ZZ Top: A Tribute from Friends.

Charts

Weekly charts

ZZ Top

Martay feat. ZZ Top

Year-end charts

References

1983 singles
1983 songs
Lonestar songs
Songs written by Billy Gibbons
Songs written by Dusty Hill
Songs written by Frank Beard (musician)
Warner Records singles
ZZ Top songs
Song recordings produced by Bill Ham